Morgan, the Pirate is a 1960 Italian-French international co-production historical adventure film, directed by André de Toth and Primo Zeglio, and starring Steve Reeves as Sir Henry Morgan, the pirate who became the self-proclaimed governor of Jamaica.

Plot
In 1670, freeborn Englishman, Henry Morgan, is enslaved by the Spaniards in Panama and sold to Doña Inez, daughter of Governor Don José Guzmán. Morgan falls in love with his mistress, much to the dismay of her father, who punishes him by sentencing him to a life of hard labor aboard a Spanish galleon. Morgan leads his fellow slaves in mutiny, takes command of the ship, and becomes a pirate, without knowing that Doña Inez was on board, on her way to Spain. She becomes his prisoner, but spurns him when he declares his love in Tortuga. Not long after, Morgan's daring exploits on the Spanish Main pique the interest of King Charles II of England, and Morgan agrees to attack only Spanish vessels in return for English ships and men. Fearing for the security of Doña Inez, after the pirates discover her identity, he permits her to return to Panama. Once there, she warns Don José of Morgan's planned invasion, and the pirate ships are either easily sunk or routed by the alerted Spanish. Not giving up, Morgan leads his men overland and attacks the city from the rear. The maneuver succeeds, Panama falls to the pirates, and Doña Inez finally admits her love for Morgan.

Cast
 Steve Reeves as Sir Henry Morgan
 Valérie Lagrange as Doña Inez 
 Ivo Garrani as Governor Don José Guzmán 
 Chelo Alonso as Concepción 
 Lydia Alfonsi as Doña María
 Armand Mestral as François l'Olonnais
 Giulio Bosetti as Sir Thomas Modyford 
 Angelo Zanolli as David 
 George Ardisson as Walter

Release
Morgan, the Pirate was released in Italy on 17 November 1960. It was released in the United States on 6 July 1961 with a 93-minute running time.

Reception
Turner Classic Movies' Jeff Stafford writes, "Largely due to de Toth's direction, Morgan the Pirate is a lively, fast-paced entertainment with moments of tongue-in-cheek humor that is several notches in quality above the usual turgid, Italian-made spectacle. The striking cinematography, filmed in garish Eastmancolor, is by the award-winning Tonino Delli Colli who has lensed such art house classics as Pasolini's The Gospel According to St. Matthew (1964), Marco Bellocchio's China Is Near (1967), and Sergio Leone's Once Upon a Time in the West (1968). And the amusing, Ravel-inspired score by Franco Mannino strikes the perfect mock-epic tone. Among the more memorable set pieces are an exotic voodoo dance performed by Cuban sex bomb Chelo Alonso (a former dancer at the Folies Bergère in Paris), a battle at sea in which Morgan's men, disguised as women, storm a Spanish galleon in full drag, and the bloody, climactic sacking of Panama with shootings, stabbings and explosions galore."

References

Footnotes

Sources

External links

 
 
 
 

1960 films
1960s historical adventure films
French swashbuckler films
Italian swashbuckler films
CinemaScope films
Pirate films
French historical adventure films
Italian historical adventure films
1960s Italian-language films
English-language French films
English-language Italian films
1960s English-language films
Films directed by Andre DeToth
Films directed by Primo Zeglio
Films set in the 1650s
Films set in the 1660s
Films set in the 1670s
Films adapted into comics
Metro-Goldwyn-Mayer films
Cultural depictions of Henry Morgan
Lux Film films
1960s multilingual films
French multilingual films
Italian multilingual films
1960s Italian films
1960s French films